Minmose was an ancient Egyptian personal theophoric name. Some notable bearers were:

Minmose (overseer of works) during the 18th Dynasty
Minmose (overseer of granaries) during the 18th Dynasty
Minmose (High Priest) during the 19th Dynasty

References

Ancient Egyptian given names
Theophoric names